The men's 300 m time trial competition in inline speed skating at the 2005 World Games took place on 19 July 2005 at the Sportpark Wedau, Dreieckswiese in Duisburg, Germany.

Competition format
A total of 22 athletes entered the competition. Athlete with the fastest time is a winner.

Results

References

External links
 Results on IWGA website

Inline speed skating at the 2005 World Games